The 1972 United States Senate election in Illinois took place on November 7, 1972.  Incumbent Republican United States Senator Charles H. Percy sought re-election to the United States Senate. Percy was opposed by Democratic nominee Roman Pucinski, a United States Congressman from Illinois's 11th congressional district, whom he was able to defeat handily to win a second term. , this was the last time a Republican was elected to the U.S. Senate from Illinois during a presidential election year,the last time an Illinois Republican won a Senate election by double digits and the last time any candidate has swept every county in the state.

Election information
The primary (held on March 21) and general election coincided with those for House and state elections.

Turnout
Turnout in the primaries was 31.40%, with a total of 1,753,727 votes cast.

Turnout during the general election was 51.24%, with 3,184,764 votes cast.

Turnout in both the primary and general election was significantly less than those for coinciding statewide races.

Democratic primary
Congressman Roman Pucinski defeated Dakin Williams in the Democratic primary. Williams was a prosecutor who was the younger brother of playwright Tennessee Williams.

Candidates
Roman Pucinski, United States Congressman from Illinois's 11th congressional district
Dakin Williams, prosecutor

Results

Republican primary
Incumbent Charles H. Percy was renominated without opposition in the Republican primary.

Candidates
Charles H. Percy, incumbent United States Senator

Results

Other nominees
Edward C. Gross (Socialist Labor), perennial candidate
Arnold Becchetti (Communist)

General election

See also 
 United States Senate elections, 1972

References

Illinois
1972
1972 Illinois elections